Zam Zam Abdullahi Abdi is a Somali journalist and human rights activist. She focuses in particular on the rights of women and children. She is a dual citizen of Somalia and Kenya.

Activism 
Abdi is the capacity building officer for the Coalition of Grassroots Women's Organizations and chairperson of the Somali Chapter of the African Network for the Prevention and Protection against Child Abuse and Neglect. Abdi works for easier access to education for Somali women.

Kidnapping 
In 2004, while in charge of information for the Association of Somali Women Journalists, Abdi was abducted and held by armed individuals from 24 October to the 25th in Mogadishu, the capital of Somalia. She believes that she was kidnapped because of her activities in defense of children.

2016 terrorism allegations 
In October 2016 Zam Zam Abdullahi Abdi went on trial in Kenya's High Court. She was accused of bombing a police station in Mombasa.

The lawsuit was denounced by the organization Cage Africa as the lawyers of the four activists concerned were not allowed to present evidence to challenge the charges. The activists are reported to have been subject to invasive strip searches.

References 

Somalian journalists
Somalian women's rights activists
Somalian women activists
Somalian women writers
Year of birth missing (living people)
Living people